Good Times is an American television sitcom that aired for six seasons on CBS, from February 8, 1974, to August 1, 1979. Created by Eric Monte and Mike Evans and developed by executive producer Norman Lear, it was television's first African American two-parent family sitcom. Good Times is a spin-off of Maude, which itself is a spin-off of All in the Family, arguably making Good Times the first television spin-off from another spin-off. 

In September 2020, it was announced that the series would receive an animated sitcom revival produced with Norman Lear executive producing alongside Seth MacFarlane and Steph Curry for Netflix.

Synopsis

Florida and James (renamed from Henry) Evans and their three children live at 921 North Gilbert Avenue, apartment 17C, in a public housing project in a poor, black neighborhood in inner-city Chicago. The project is unnamed on the show but is implicitly the infamous Cabrini–Green Homes, shown in the opening and closing credits. Florida and James have three children: James Jr., also known as "J.J."; Thelma; and Michael, whose passionate activism causes his father to call him "the militant midget." 

When the series begins, J.J. is 17 (portrayed by 26-year-old Jimmie Walker, who was just eight years younger than co-star John Amos), Thelma 16 and Michael 11. Their exuberant neighbor and Florida's best friend is Willona Woods, a recent divorcée who works at a boutique. Their building superintendent is Nathan Bookman (seasons 2–6), who James, Willona and later J.J. refer to as "Buffalo Butt" or, even more derisively, "Booger."

The characters originated on the sitcom Maude as Florida and Henry Evans, with Florida employed as Maude Findlay's housekeeper in Tuckahoe, New York, and Henry employed as a New York City firefighter. When producers decided to feature the Florida character in her own show, they changed the characters' history to fit a new series that was well into development rather than start from scratch to create a consistent starring vehicle. Henry's name became James, he worked various odd jobs, there was no mention of Maude but it was mentioned that Florida was a maid once before in the episode 'The Checkup' and the couple lived in Chicago. 

James Evans often works at least two jobs, mostly manual labor such as dishwasher, construction laborer, etc. Though he is often unemployed, he is a proud man who will not accept charity. He sometimes hustles money playing pool, although Florida disapproves of this.

Episodes

Cast and characters

Main

Supporting

 Ned the Wino (Raymond Allen) is the local drunk who frequents the neighborhood and the apartment building where the Evans family reside. In the season one episode "Black Jesus," J.J. uses Ned the Wino as the model for a portrait of Jesus. Another episode is centered on Michael's plan to "clean up" Ned and get him off the booze by letting him stay at the Evanses' house.
 Carl Dixon (Moses Gunn) is an atheist shop owner for whom Michael briefly works. Despite their religious differences, Carl and Florida begin dating and become engaged in the final episode of season four. Carl breaks off the engagement after he is diagnosed with lung cancer. After a talk from Bookman, Carl again asks Florida for her hand in marriage. The two marry off-screen and move to Arizona. Florida returns at the beginning of season six, this time without Carl for Thelma's wedding. Carl is referenced briefly in that season's second episode "Florida's Homecoming Part 2," but he is never mentioned again (Florida continues to use the surname Evans instead of Dixon). (Rolle decided to come back to the show on the condition the character of Carl Dixon was written out.) Florida then revealed to Willona he died from his battle of lung cancer.
 Marion "Sweet Daddy" Williams (Theodore Wilson) is a menacing neighborhood numbers runner and pimp, who has a reputation for wearing flashy clothing and jewelry. He is usually accompanied by bodyguards (one portrayed by Bubba Smith, the other by series painter Ernie Barnes) and comes across as cool and threatening, but has shown a soft heart on occasion, particularly when he decided not to take an antique locket (to settle a debt) that Florida had given to Thelma because it had reminded him of his late mother. (Wilson also plays a club owner named Stanley in the season four episode, "The Comedian and the Loan Sharks").
 Alderman Fred C. Davis (Albert Reed Jr.) is a local politician with a slightly shady disposition whom the Evans generally despise. Spoofing President Richard M. Nixon, he would state in a speech, "I am not a crook." He frequently relies on the support of the Evans family (his "favorite project family") for reelection or support and resorts to threats of eviction to secure their support. In a running joke, Alderman Davis frequently forgets Willona's name and calls her another similar-sounding name that began with a "W" (such as Wilhemina, Winnifrieda, Winsomnium, Wyomia and even Waldorf-Astoria), thus earning him her everlasting ire as well as the nickname "Baldy." (In the 2019 ABC special, Live in Front of a Studio Audience, Amos portrayed the role of Davis, the only cast member from the original series to appear.)
 Lenny (Dap 'Sugar' Willie) (also known as "Lootin" Lenny), is a neighborhood hustler and peddler who tries to sell presumably stolen items that are usually attached to the lining of his fur coat. He usually approaches people with a laid-back rap and a rhyme ("my name is Len-nay, if I ain't got it, there ain't an-nay"). He is typically rebuffed by the people he approaches and responds by saying "that's cold" or uses a small brush to "brush off" the negativity.
 "Grandpa" Henry Evans (Richard Ward) is James's long-lost father. He abandoned the family years before because he was ashamed that he could not do more to provide for them. This deeply hurt James, who disregarded his father's existence, telling everyone that he was dead. Thelma learns about her grandfather while doing some family research. She meets him and invites him to the Evanses' home to surprise James for his birthday, not knowing that James was well aware of his whereabouts but chose to stay out of his life. After Henry arrives at the Evans home and meets the rest of the family, he realizes that James would not welcome him in the home and decides to leave. Florida convinces him to stay and talk to James and explains that there may never be another chance to do so. Henry and James have a heart-to-heart talk, with Henry being remorseful and apologetic. James ultimately forgives his father. After James's death, the Evans family embraces Henry into the family, alongside his common law (and eventually legal) wife Lena (Paulene Myers) in later episodes.
 Wanda Williams (Helen Martin) is another resident in the apartment building where the Evans reside. Earlier episodes show her at a women's support group, and the tenants rallying around her by giving her a rent party. Later episodes show her appearing and crying at several funerals, whether she knew the person or not, thus earning her the nickname "Weeping Wanda" from J.J. and Willona.
 Lynnetta Gordon (Chip Fields) is Penny's abusive biological mother whose first appearance is in the four-part fifth season opening episode, "The Evans Get Involved." Penny's father abandoned her mom when Lynnetta became pregnant at 16. As a result, she takes her anger and frustrations out on Penny, including burning her with a hot iron. After the abuse is finally brought to light, she tells the Evans family that she herself was abused as a child. She gets into a fighting match with Willona and Thelma and they plead for her to seek therapy. Just before she disappears, she expresses regret for hurting her child, telling Willona that Penny deserves better than her. This clears the way for Willona to adopt Penny. She reappears more than a year later, in the sixth-season episode, "A Matter of Mothers," having gotten married and reveals that her new husband is from a very wealthy family. She uses her husband's wealth to send Penny anonymous gifts and, in an effort to regain custody of Penny, also attempts to frame Willona as an unfit adoptive mother who throws wild parties with less than wholesome attendees. However, her scheme is exposed by being recorded on tape admitting that the scheme was a set up to get Penny back. After Lynnetta tries to get the tape from Penny and threatens to hurt her again, which is stopped by Willona, Penny tells Lynnetta that no matter what anyone says, she will always consider Willona her real mother. Devastated, Lynnetta decides to drop the charges against Willona and leaves Penny with her, never to be seen again.
 Cleatus (John Bailey) is a cousin of J.J. Evans, Thelma Evans Anderson and Michael Evans and nephew of Florida Evans and James Evans. He made one appearance in the episode "Cousin Cleatus."
 Violet Bookman (Marilyn Coleman) is the wife of Bookman (episodes: "Bye, Bye Bookman" and "Willona, the Other Woman" in season 5).

Notable guest stars

 Mary Alice as Loretta Simpson in the episode The Baby (season 3, episode 7). 
 Debbie Allen as J.J.'s drug-addicted fiancée, Diana Buchanan in "J.J.'s Fiancee (Parts 1 & 2)" (season 3)
 Matthew Beard (former Our Gang child actor) in five episodes, including four appearances as James' friend Monty
 Taurean Blacque as Chopper in the episode “Breaker, Breaker (season 5, episode 8) and as John Dunbar Jr. in the episode “The Boarder” (season 5, episode 18)
 Sorrell Booke as Mr. Galbraith, J.J.'s boss at the ad agency (season 5, episode 17)
 Kathleen Bradley as the nurse in the episode “Blood Will Tell”. (season 6, episode 16) 
 Roscoe Lee Browne as a shady televangelist Reverend Sam "the Happiness Man", who befriended James in the military (season 1, episode 4)
 Tony Burton as Aide in the Episode: "Evans Versus Davis" (Season 4, Episode 6)
 T. K. Carter as J.J.'s friend "Head" (part of the "Awesome Foursome", later the "Gleesome Threesome", the "Gruesome Twosome" and the "Lonesome Onesome," as stated in the episode "The New Car")
 Rosalind Cash as Thelma's teacher, Jessica Bishop, who becomes romantically involved with a much younger J.J. (season 4, episode 3)
 Alvin Childress as Reverend Gordon in the episode “The Windfall. (season 2, episode 12)
 William Christopher as The Army Doctor in the episode "The Enlistment" (season 2, episode 22)
 Bill Cobbs as George Gillard in the episode "Evans Versus Davis" (Season 4, episode 6)
 Judith Cohen as herself in the episode "The Judy Cohen Story" (season 4, episode 12)
 Gary Coleman as Gary, a sharp-tongued classmate of Penny's in two season five episodes
 Conchata Ferrell as Miss Johnson, Willona's supervisor at her short-lived second job as security in a department store (season 5, episode 6)
 Kim Fields (real-life daughter of Chip Fields) as Penny's friend, Kim, who has a tendency to add the suffix "-ness" to emphasize her anxiety such as "hopelessnessness" (2 season 6 episodes)
 Carl Franklin as Larry, Thelma's fiancé', ultimately breaking up when Larry is offered a job on the West Coast and Thelma is not ready to accompany him (2 episodes)
 Alice Ghostley as Ms. Dobbs, a social worker who is working on Penny being adopted by Willona (3 episodes)
 Ron Glass as Michael's elementary school principal (2.4); also made an appearance as a blind encyclopedia salesman who tries to swindle the Evans family (2.8)
 Louis Gossett Jr., in season two as Thelma's older boyfriend (Florida and James object to their relationship because of the age difference) (2.6); also appears as Uncle Wilbert (Florida's brother), who comes from Detroit to look in on the family while James is away (3.8)
 Robert Guillaume as Fishbone the wino in the episode "Requiem for a Wino" (season 5, episode 11)
 Phillip Baker Hall as Motel Owner in the episode "J.J.'s Fiancee (Part 2)" (season 3, episode 18)
 Lynn Hamilton as Mrs. Edwards, mother of Mad Dog , who shot J.J. (season 2, episode 10)
 Shirley Hemphill as "Roz", the dimwitted sister of Edna, who was being tutored by Thelma (season 4, episode 10)
 Gordon Jump as Mr. Rogers, the head of security at Willona's short-lived second job as security in a department store (season 5, episode 6)
 Paula Kelly as Dr. Kelly in the episode "Where Have All The Doctors Gone" (season 6, episode 17)
 Richard Lawson as Raymond, J.J.’s friend and co-worker  (season 5, episode 17)
 Jay Leno as "Young Man" in the season three's "J.J. in Trouble", which was one of the first times that the subject of "VD" (STD) was addressed on a primetime series
 Richard Libertini as Painter #1 in the episode "Love Has A Spot On His Lung: Part 2" (season 4, episode 24). 
 Calvin Lockhart as Florida's cousin Raymond, who earned his riches by betting on horses (season 6, episode 23)
 Don Marshall as FBI Agent Lloyd in the episode "The Investigation" (season 3, episode 20).
 Paul Mooney as "The Second Guy" in the episode "J.J. and T.C." (season 6).
 Debbi Morgan as Samantha, a date of J.J.'s (3.23); and as Ellen (4.18)
 Nancy Morgan as Cindy Crebbins in the episode "Michael’s Decision" (season 6, episode8)
 Judy Pace as Gloria Jackson in the episode “The Weekend” (season 3, episode 6) 
 J. A. Preston as Walter Ingles in the episode "Wilona's Dilemma" (season 3, episode 10)
 Charlotte Rae as a hiring manager for a sales job that Florida stole from James (season 2, episode 14)
 Sheryl Lee Ralph as Vanessa in the episode "J.J. and The Plumber's Helper" (season 6, episode 9)
 Thalmus Rasulala as Ernie Harris, in the episode "The Houseguest" (season 2, episode 20)
 Albert Reed Jr. as Alderman Fred C. Davis also played cousin Oscar in Season 2 episode Sometimes There's No Bottom in the Bottle
 Percy Rodriguez as Florida’s cousin Edgar.(season 3, episode 5) 
 Timmie Rogers as Donald the Wino in the episode “The Snow Storm”. (season 6, episode 11)
 Bubba Smith as Claude, a bodyguard/thug working for Marion "Sweet Daddy" Williams (4 season 6 episodes)
 Richard Stahl as Judge Daniels in the episode “The Gang:Part 2” (season 2, episode 10) 
 Philip Michael Thomas as Eddie, Thelma's college-age boyfriend (season 1, episode 6)
 Adam Wade as successful businessman Frank Mason, Willona's boyfriend (Season 5, 2 episodes)
 Vernee Watson-Johnson as Thelma's friend and college mate Valerie, in the episode "Thelma's African Romance (Part 1)" (season 4)
 Carl Weathers as Calvin Brooks, husband of the 'nude' model for J.J.'s painting (season 2, episode 16)
 Lee Weaver as the second man in season 4 episode "The Big Move: Part 2". 
 Hal Williams as one of the movers in a season one episode; James' friend, Willie Washington (season 2); and Mr. Mitchell, the father of Earl Mitchell, who is an art student of J.J.'s (season 6)
 John Witherspoon as Officer Lawson in the episode "A Matter of Mothers" (season 6, episode 20)
 Betty A. Bridges as an women in the apartment complex who asks J.J. to paint her for her husband's birthday in the episode "The Nude" (season 2, episode 16)

Production
Good Times was created by Eric Monte and actor Mike Evans. The series also features a character named "Michael Evans" after Evans, who portrayed Lionel Jefferson on the Lear-produced series All in the Family and The Jeffersons.

Theme song and opening sequence

The gospel-styled theme song was composed by Dave Grusin with lyrics written by Alan and Marilyn Bergman. It was sung by Jim Gilstrap and Motown singer Blinky Williams with a gospel choir providing background vocals. The lyrics to the theme song are notorious for being hard to discern, notably the line "Hangin' in a chow line"/"Hangin' in and jivin'" (depending on the source used). Dave Chappelle used this part of the lyrics as a quiz in his "I Know Black People" skit on Chappelle's Show in which the former was claimed as the answer. The insert for the Season One DVD box set has the lyric as "Hangin' in a chow line." However, the Bergmans, along with Bern Nadette Stanis, confirmed that the lyric is actually "Hangin' in and jivin'." Slightly different lyrics were used for the closing credits, with the song beginning on a verse instead of the chorus.

Casting
When Ralph Carter was cast as the youngest Evans child, Michael, he was a cast member in the Broadway musical Raisin and the producers of Raisin were initially reluctant to accept Tandem Productions' buyout offer. While Carter's contract was being negotiated, another young actor, Larry Fishburne (later Laurence) filled the role of Michael during initial rehearsals for Good Times. Early episodes of Good Times contain a notice in the credits: "Ralph Carter appears courtesy of the Broadway musical Raisin."

Cast conflicts

Good Times was intended to be a timely show in the All in the Family vein focused on Rolle and Amos. Both expected the show to deal with serious topics in a comedic way while providing positive characters for viewers to identify with. However, it was Walker's character of J.J. that was an immediate hit with audiences and became the breakout character of the series. J.J.'s frequent use of the expression "Dy-no-mite!" (often in the phrase "Kid Dy-no-mite!"), credited to director John Rich, became a popular catchphrase (later included in TV Land's The 100 Greatest TV Quotes and Catch Phrases special). 

Rich insisted Walker say it in every episode. Walker and executive producer Norman Lear were skeptical of the idea, but the phrase and the J.J. Evans character caught on with the audience. As a result of the character's popularity, the writers focused more on J.J.'s comedic antics instead of serious issues. Throughout seasons two and three, Rolle and Amos grew increasingly disillusioned with the direction of the show and especially with J.J.'s tomfoolery and stereotypically buffoonish behavior. Rolle was vocal about her hate of his character. In a 1975 interview with Ebony magazine she stated: Despite doing so less publicly than Rolle, Amos also was outspoken about his dissatisfaction with the J.J. character, stating:  While Amos was less public with his dissatisfaction than Rolle, he was fired after season three due to disagreements with Lear. Amos' departure was initially attributed to his desire to focus on a film career, but he admitted in a 1976 interview that Lear called him and told him that his contract option with the show was not being renewed. Amos stated, "That's the same thing as being fired." The producers decided not to recast the character of James Evans, instead opting to kill off the character in the two-part season four episode, "The Big Move," with Florida finding out that James died in an automobile accident while in Mississippi.

Final seasons
By the end of season four, Rolle had also become dissatisfied with the show's direction and decided to leave the series. In the two-part season finale, "Love Has a Spot On His Lung," Florida gets engaged to Carl Dixon (Moses Gunn), a man she began dating toward the end of season four. In the season five premiere episode, "The Evans Get Involved Part 1," it is revealed that Florida and Carl married off screen and moved to Arizona for the sake of Carl's health. With Amos and Rolle gone, DuBois took over as lead actor, as Willona checked in on the Evans children since they were now living alone.

In season five, Janet Jackson joined the cast, playing Penny Gordon, an abused girl abandoned by her mother and eventually adopted by Willona. During that season, Johnny Brown's character of Nathan Bookman, the Evans' superintendent, became more prominent. At the beginning of the fifth year, Brown became a series regular and was included in the opening credits. Ratings began to decline. It was clear to the producers as well as viewers that Rolle's absence had left the series without a much-needed unifying center of attention.

Before the taping of season six began, CBS and the show's producers decided that they had to do "something drastic" to increase viewership. According to then-vice president of CBS programming Steve Mills, "We had lost the essence of the show. Without parental guidance, the show slipped. Everything told us that: our mail, our phone calls, our research. We felt we had to go back to basics."

Producers approached Rolle with an offer to appear in a guest role on the series. Rolle was initially hesitant, but when producers agreed to a number of her demands (including an increased salary and higher quality scripts), she agreed to return to the series on a full-time basis. Rolle also wanted producers to make the character of J.J. more responsible, as she felt the character was a poor role model for African-American youths. She also requested that producers write out the character of Carl Dixon; Rolle reportedly disliked the storyline surrounding the Carl Dixon character, as she believed Florida would not have moved on so quickly after James's death or left her children. Rolle also thought the writers had disregarded Florida's devout Christian beliefs by having her fall for and marry Carl, who was an atheist. 

In the season six premiere episode "Florida's Homecoming: Part 1," Florida returns from Arizona without Carl to attend Thelma's upcoming wedding to professional football player Keith Anderson (Ben Powers, who joined the cast for the final season). In a rare uncut version of "Florida's Homecoming: Part 2," after Florida arrives home from Arizona, Willona briefly pulls her aside and mentions Carl, to which Florida sadly smiles and shakes her head, implying that Carl had died from cancer. Florida later mentions Carl one last time when she tells Michael about a book they'd both bought him.

Despite changes in the series at Rolle's request and her return, plus the addition of Powers to the cast, ratings continued to fall and CBS canceled the series during the 1978–79 season. In the series finale episode "The End of the Rainbow," each character finally gets a "happy ending." J.J. gets his big break as a nationally syndicated artist for a comic book company with his newly created character, DynoWoman, which is based on Thelma (much to her surprise and delight) and is moving into an apartment with some lady friends.

Michael attends college and moves into an on-campus dorm. Keith's bad knee heals due to his exercise and own physical therapy, leading to the Chicago Bears offering him a contract to play football. Keith announces that he and Thelma are moving into a luxury apartment in the city's upscale Gold Coast district. Thelma also announces that she is pregnant with the couple's first child.

Keith offers Florida the chance to move in with them so she can help Thelma with the new baby; Florida accepts the offer. Willona becomes the head buyer of the boutique, she walks in and announces that she and Penny are also moving out of the projects. Willona then reveals that her new apartment is in the same apartment building to which Keith, Thelma and Florida are also moving; she and Penny become the Evanses' downstairs neighbors.

Broadcast and syndication
Cable network TV One aired reruns of the show since its launch on January 19, 2004. Good Times had also aired at various times on TV Land and on the Canadian specialty cable channel DejaView. Minisodes of the show are available for free on Crackle. Additionally, digital multicast network Antenna TV also aired episodes of the show until January 1, 2018, when GetTV, operated by Sony (which distributes the show), began airing the program. Good Times airs on GetTV with a TV-PG rating. 

Most episodes run on TV One with a TV-G rating, with the lone exception being the season three episode "J.J. in Trouble," in which J.J. fears he may have contracted an STD. That episode airs with a TV-14 rating, as well as the "parental guidance is suggested" slide that preceded the episode when it was originally broadcast on CBS. In the past, it aired on TV Land with a TV-PG rating.

Home media
Sony Pictures Home Entertainment released the entire series on DVD in Region 1 between February 2003 and August 2006, with a complete box set following the separate seasons on October 28, 2008. Season 1 was released on DVD in Region 4 on December 27, 2006. On August 27, 2013, it was announced that Mill Creek Entertainment had acquired the rights to various television series from the Sony Pictures library, including Good Times. They have subsequently re-released the first four seasons on DVD. On September 1, 2015, Mill Creek Entertainment re-released Good Times: The Complete Series on DVD in Region 1.

All episodes are available to stream on Peacock Premium.

Reception

Ratings

The program premiered in February 1974; high ratings led CBS to renew the program for the 1974–75 season, as it was the seventeenth-highest-rated program that year. During its first full season on the air, the show was the seventh-highest-rated program in the Nielsen ratings, with more than 25% of all American households tuning into an episode each week. Three of the top ten highest-rated programs on American TV that season centered on the lives of African-Americans: Sanford and Son, The Jeffersons and Good Times. The Nielsen ratings for the series declined over time, partly because of its many time slot changes and the departure of John Amos. The ratings went down considerably when the show entered its final two seasons:

Awards and nominations

References

External links

 
 Good Times at TVLand.com
 

1974 American television series debuts
1979 American television series endings
1970s American sitcoms
1970s American black sitcoms
All in the Family
American television spin-offs
CBS original programming
English-language television shows
Mass media portrayals of the working class
Television series about families
Television series about widowhood
Television series by Sony Pictures Television
Television shows set in Chicago
Television shows filmed in California